The Torquay Round was a multi-year multilateral trade negotiation (MTN) between  nation-states that were parties to the GATT. This third round occurred in Torquay, England in 1951. Thirty-eight countries took part in the round. 8,700 tariff concessions were made totalling the remaining amount of tariffs to ¾ of the tariffs which were in effect in 1948. The contemporaneous rejection by the U.S. of the Havana Charter signified the establishment of the GATT as a governing world body.

References

World Trade Organization
General Agreement on Tariffs and Trade
Commercial treaties
Treaties concluded in 1951